Cartland Blake Richardson  is the drummer for American progressive metal band Between the Buried and Me, as well as the drummer for Glass Casket. Joining in early 2005, Richardson replaced Between the Buried and Me's former drummer Jason Roe.

Biography
Richardson attended middle school at Calvary Baptist Day School in Winston-Salem, North Carolina. He later attended Mt. Tabor High School and performed an annual drum solo for a school-club project named 'Spartan Spectacular'. Playing since he was 11 years old, he became an immediate fan of 1990s grunge music. Being inspired by bands such as Soundgarden, Nirvana, and Smashing Pumpkins, his passion for heavy music grew as much as his love for drumming did. After taking lessons for several years from local jazz percussionist/drummer Robert Crutchfield, he developed his skills and started playing with his first band, Glass Casket, at the age of 17. After significant touring throughout the US, he graduated high school in 2003 and attended NC State University for two years.

After getting an offer to play drums for home-state friends Between the Buried and Me he helped to start writing the band's third full-length album Alaska and finally left school in 2005 to tour full-time. Since then the band has toured relentlessly. Sharing the stage with friends in Black Dahlia Murder, Bleeding Through, Every Time I Die, and Dillinger Escape Plan helped land them a spot on Ozzfest 2006 with System of a Down and Ozzy Osbourne. After seemingly endless touring to support his first album with Between the Buried and Me, the band began writing for their fourth studio album Colors. This album helped push the band, as well as Richardson's drumming style, into the more progressive metal element. Not going unnoticed, the band's developed new sound and groundbreaking new album helped them earn a spot on the first ever "Progressive Nation Tour", which featured Dream Theater, Opeth, and Three.

Style
Richardson's drumming is characterized by a fusion of death metal elements as well as jazz influences. Noted for his blast beats, odd timing, double bass drumming, and fill-heavy style, Richardson is considered a standout in his field. His favorite drummers include Terry Bozzio, Dennis Chambers, Dave Grohl, Simon Phillips, Dave Weckl, Morgan Ågren, Virgil Donati, Ken Schalk and Tomas Haake.

During the Progressive Nation 2008 tour Blake performed alongside Mike Portnoy (ex-Dream Theater) where the two soloed together.

Equipment
Tama Starclassic Performer B/B: Egyptian Night Burst
2x  kick drums
 rack tom
 rack tom
 rack tom
 floor tom
 snare drum

Sabian Cymbals:
9" Radia Cup Chime
Sabian Low Max Stax
10" HH Duo Splash
18" HHX Evolution Crash
19" AAX Holy China
17" AAX X-treme China (on left)
21" AA Holy China (on right)
21" HH Raw Bell Dry Ride
14" HHX Evolution Hi-Hats
12" Chopper Cymbal
15" Birdbath (cracked)

Tama Iron Cobra Flexi Glide Kick Pedals, Tama Hardware

3A Vic Firth Drumsticks

Evans Drumheads (Hybrid on snare, Gmad on kick drums, and EC2 SST on toms)

References

American heavy metal drummers
Living people
Musicians from North Carolina
1984 births
Between the Buried and Me members
21st-century American drummers